The 2000 World Series of Poker (WSOP) was held at Binion's Horseshoe.

Preliminary events

Main Event
There were 512 entrants to the main event. Each paid $10,000 to enter the tournament. The 2000 Main Event was the first time the total entries of the Main Event surpassed 500 players.

Ferguson had a 10 to 1 chip lead when starting his heads-up against Cloutier. After a back-and-forth battle, Ferguson decided to call Cloutier's AQ all-in with his own A9. When a 9 appeared on the river, Ferguson had beaten the tournament favourite.

Final table

*Career statistics prior to the beginning of the 2000 Main Event.

Final table results

Other High Finishes
NB: This list is restricted to top 30 finishers with an existing Wikipedia entry.

External links
2000 World Series of Poker at Conjelco.com

World Series of Poker
World Series of Poker